Blast from the Past is a two CD compilation album that contains re-recordings of older Gamma Ray material from the Ralf Scheepers era, with Kai Hansen singing the vocals, and remasters of more recent tracks. All instruments for old songs were also re-recorded, with new arrangements, by the then current members of the band.

The songs from each era to be included in the compilation were chosen by the band's fans.

Track listing

Note: All tracks on CD 1 and tracks 1-3 on CD 2 are completely new recordings from the year 2000. Tracks 4-10 on CD2 are remastered versions of the original recordings.

Personnel
 Kai Hansen - vocals, guitar
 Henjo Richter - guitar, keyboards
 Dirk Schlächter - bass
 Dan Zimmermann - drums

Production
 Mixed at: Hansen Studio, Hamburg, Germany
 Engineered by: Dirk Schlächter, Kai Hansen

Credits
 Cover Art by: Derek Riggs
 Digital Artwork and Booklet Design by: Henjo Richter

References

Gamma Ray (band) albums
2000 remix albums
Sanctuary Records remix albums
Albums produced by Kai Hansen